"Blue Bird" (синяя птица ; sinyaya ptitsa) is a Russian folk song.

The song begins: 
Жила на свете птица синяя,.. 
Zhila na svete ptitsa sinyaya,..
There lived in the world a blue bird,..

References

Russian songs